Doizieux is a commune in the Loire department in central France.

Geography
It is in the heart of the Parc naturel régional du Pilat.

The Dorlay river, a tributary of the Gier that rises in Mont Pilat, flows through the commune.

Administration

Population

See also
 Communes of the Loire department

References

External links
 Doizieux on Insee website

Communes of Loire (department)